RAF Manorbier was a Royal Air Force airfield near Manorbier, Pembrokeshire, Wales. The site was first used in 1933 as a mixed civilian/military airfield and was the base for 'Y' Flight of No. 1 Anti-Aircraft Co-operation Unit RAF in 1937, using de Havilland DH.82 Queen Bee unmanned radio-controlled target drone.

The airfield was passed on to the War Office in September 1946 and the site, now known as the Air Defence Range Manorbier, is currently used by the Ministry of Defence as a testing range for high-velocity missiles.

History 

RAF Manorbier started as a mixed civil and military airfield in 1933. The 8th Earl of Essex kept his aircraft there while the RAF used it as a landing ground for land-based aircraft visiting the flying boat base of Pembroke Dock, however this ended in 1935.

The site, consisting of a grass runway and canvas tents, was then used as an anti-aircraft training school from the spring of 1937 with No. 1 Anti-Aircraft Co-operation Unit RAF 'Y' Flight being based at the airfield. The unit operated the de Havilland Queen Bees, a pilot-less radio-controlled version of the de Havilland Tiger Moth trainer, which was used for anti-aircraft gunnery practice. The runway was enlarged in 1940 and the airfield acquired catapults to launch Queen Bees from clifftops so gunnery practice could be continued when the grass runways were flooded. Defences were also fitted to the airfield, including the Pickett-Hamilton retractable pillbox, which can be fitted with different calibre guns and can be raised or lowered hydraulically.

From 1939, the Pilotless Aircraft Unit (PAU) was based permanently at Manorbier, using a tender to retrieve drones from the sea and return them back to the base. The unit continued to use the airfield even after the war.

The airfield was occupied by No. 11 Group RAF in 1944, it was also occupied by No. 595 Squadron RAF from 1 December 1943. The squadron flew a wide variety of aircraft, including the Hawker Henley Mk III, Hawker Hurricane Mks IIC and IV, Miles Martinet, Airspeed Oxford, Vultee Vengeance and the Supermarine Spitfire Mks VB, XII, IX and XVI. The squadron left on 27 April 1946.

The following units were here at some point:
 No. 2767 Squadron RAF Regiment
 No. 4109 Anti-Aircraft Flight RAF Regiment

Current use 
The site is currently used as training and testing range for the British Army known as Air Defence Range Manorbier, the testing range fires a maximum of 750 surface-to-air missile each year on 100 designated testing days. The principle weapon system fired at Manorbier was fitted for night operation in 2005, the only suitable site for testing new night vision technology at the time. The Ministry of Defence also proposed a plan to launch a maximum of 100 missile for 20 nights a year. This was met with opposition from the locals who claimed that should the plan be approved, tourism will suffer and air pollution in the area will increase.

See also 
List of former Royal Air Force stations
List of Royal Air Force aircraft squadrons

References

External links
 Experience Pembrokeshire – RAF Manorbier

Bombing ranges
Royal Air Force stations in Wales
Military airbases established in 1933